Marianne Vos (born 13 May 1987) is a Dutch multi-discipline cyclist, who currently rides for UCI Women's WorldTeam .

After winning a junior European and World Championship in road racing, she continued her success in senior cycling by becoming World Champion in cyclo-cross and road racing at the age of 19. Vos added track racing World Championships when she won the points race in 2008 and the scratch race in 2011. At the 2008 Summer Olympics, she won the gold medal in the points race; at the 2012 Summer Olympics, gold in the women's road race. She is a 3 times World Road Race Champion – in 2006, 2012 and 2013 – and 8 times World Cyclo-cross Champion – in 2006, 2009, 2010, 2011, 2012, 2013, 2014 and 2022.

She has multiple wins at the Giro Rosa, Holland Ladies Tour, Ladies Tour of Norway, La Flèche Wallonne, Ronde van Drenthe, Trofeo Alfredo Binda-Comune di Cittiglio, Emakumeen Euskal Bira and GP de Plouay – Bretagne; also she ranked first in points in the UCI Women's Road World Cup five times and in the 2019 UCI Women's World Tour. She has 24 races at the UCI Cyclo-cross World Cup, and claimed the first place overall in the 2018–19 season.

Vos was a founding member of Le Tour Entier, which campaigned for a Women's Tour de France and improvements to women's cycling generally. Vos has drawn comparison to Eddy Merckx as being "the finest cyclist of [her] generation".

Early years
Marianne Vos was born in 's-Hertogenbosch, North Brabant and lives in the small village of Babyloniënbroek. She started her career when she was six years old after watching her older brother who was already a cyclist. At first she trained with her brother's team as she was not allowed to participate in races; during the winter she started training in cyclo-cross as well. When she was eight, she was able to ride races. Vos also participated in speed skating and inline speed skating. At 14 she replaced inline skating with mountain biking.

Professional career

2002–2003
In 2002, she won two national championships and finished second in another. She became Dutch mountain biking champion and won the national junior road race, while she finished second in the Dutch time trial championship behind Roxane Knetemann. In 2003 Vos successfully defended her national junior mountain bike title. At the time trial championships she again finished second, this time behind Maxime Groenewegen while 2002 champion Roxane Knetemann finished fourth.

2004
Vos excelled in cyclo-cross for the first time in 2004 when she won her first international race in Gieten, beating Birgit Hollmann and Arenda Grimberg. She finished third in the Dutch junior road race and time trial, unable to beat Ellen van Dijk who won both events. Continuing her cyclo-cross season she added wins in Surhuisterveen and Pijnacker–Nootdorp. In the last she beat Hanka Kupfernagel and Daphny van den Brand. For the third straight time she became Dutch junior champion in mountain biking before heading to Verona for the junior road world championship. Aged 17 and a first-year junior, Vos broke away in the final of five laps on the climb. She stayed clear and became world champion. At the end of 2004 Vos was elected Sport FM Sportswoman of the year 2004.

2005
As junior world champion Vos claimed her first Dutch junior national road title in front of 2004 champion Ellen van Dijk. Van Dijk was able to defend her time trial title successfully before Maxime Groenewegen, while Vos finished third again. Participating as a senior at the Dutch cyclo-cross championship Vos finished second behind Daphny van den Brand. She then won her fourth Dutch junior mountain bike title, before winning a junior World Cup meeting in Houffalize. She finished fourth at the world junior cyclo-cross championship and won a race held in Heeswijk a week later. From then on Vos occasionally took part in senior road races. One was the Omloop van Borsele which she won by beating Adrie Visser. Including Vos's world championship in 2004 the Netherlands had won the last three editions of the junior championship (the others being Loes Markerink in 2002 and Suzanne de Goede in 2003). Vos's goal was to add a fourth title by defending her title in Salzburg, but she finished second behind Denmark's Mie Bekker Lacota.

Vos competed in cyclo-cross again. Six weeks after her silver medal in Salzburg she won in Harderwijk and Suameer. Her next aim was the European cyclo-cross championship in Pontchâteau, France. She started in the elite field and was expected to assist Daphny van den Brand but instead beat the favourites, including van den Brand who won silver. After the European championship she won two cyclo-crosses in Gieten and Loenhout. Vos was named Sport FM Sportswoman of the year 2005.

2006
Vos won her first race of 2006 on 1 January in Pétange. Less than a week later, the Dutch championship in Huijbergen was again a clash between Vos and van den Brand, this time van den Brand became champion while Vos took silver. Vos then concentrated on the world cyclo-cross championship in her own country, in Zeddam. On 29 January 2006 she was in excellent form, with only Hanka Kupfernagel and Daphny van den Brand able to catch her. Van den Brand changed bikes and lost her lead, finishing one minute behind to take bronze. The gold medal was decided in the last metres when Vos outsprinted Kupfernagel.

During the 2006 road season Vos took part in the Gracia–Orlová Tour in the Czech Republic and won the 5th stage, 2:20 ahead of the pack. In that same week she won the Omloop van Borsele for the second time in a row, beating Vera Koedooder and Bertine Spijkerman. In Spain she took part in the Emakumeen Bira and won the 1st stage. She then travelled back to the Netherlands for the national road championship in Maastricht. Vos cycled in a group containing all the favourites for the race and outsprinted Sharon van Essen and Suzanne de Goede to win the title. On 28 June 2006 Vos was named Dutch Sports Talent of the year 2006 ahead of pentathlete Laurien Hoos and gymnast Epke Zonderland. The additional award was handed to her by former swimming star Erica Terpstra.

A few weeks later she was strongest in the Omloop van Valkenburg where she again finished in front of de Goede. Vos was still in the junior age category and took part in the European road race championship in Valkenburg. She won the sprint against Italy's Tatiana Guderzo. She went on to win two stages and overall in the Tour Féminin en Limousin. In July, she won criteriums in Steenwijk, Draai van de Kaai, Oostvoorne and Pijnackerow.

In August, she signed a five-year deal with the Dutch team DSB–Ballast Nedam. It wasn't long before she won her first race with DSB. At the end of the 4th stage of the Trophée d'Or Féminin Vos beat Tanja Schmidt-Hennes.

With the silver medal won in 2005 in mind, Vos returned to Salzburg for the senior road race at the world road race championship. Vos remained in the bunch until Nicole Cooke started the action in the fifth of six laps. Cooke attacked on the second climb and only Nicole Brändli and Vos were able to catch her. A few others came back a few kilometres later. Judith Arndt left the group by herself. Vos made the jump to Arndt and they led for a few minutes until the chasers came back. From then, the group stayed together apart from attacks on either the flat road or the second climb. The race went to a sprint of 15 riders, with Vos taking another rainbow jersey.

In the European cyclo-cross championship Vos won a bronze medal behind Daphny van den Brand and Hanka Kupfernagel.

2007
Vos won La Flèche Wallonne Féminine and the Rund um die Nürnberger Altstadt World Cup events before going on to win the series overall. She also finished second in the road race world championships, conceding her title to Marta Bastianelli of Italy who broke away in the last 15 km of the race.

2008
Vos added a track cycling world title to her list when she won the women's points race at the track cycling world championships. In doing so, she became the first woman to have held world championship titles on the road, track and cyclo-cross. Vos became Olympic points race champion at the 2008 Summer Olympics in Beijing.

2009

In 2009, Vos started by winning the cyclo-cross world championships. She also had success on the road, as she won La Flèche Wallonne Féminine for the third time. Later that year, she finished second in the road world championships.

2010
In 2010, Vos became cyclo-cross world champion again and won the silver medal in the road world championships for the fourth time in a row.

2011
In 2011, Vos captured her fifth consecutive silver medal at the road world championships. She won the scratch race in the track world championships, and the world cyclo-cross championship.

Vos was appointed as a member of the inaugural UCI Athletes' Commission in 2011.

2012

In 2012, Vos won the world cyclo-cross championship again. On the road, she recorded wins at the Ronde van Drenthe and the Trofeo Alfredo Binda, but fractured her collarbone after colliding with a motorcycle during the Valkenburg Hills Classic on 25 May. Although she was still able to finish the race in second place and did not require surgery, she did not resume racing until the Dutch national championships on 23 June in which she finished second, 3 seconds behind Annemiek van Vleuten. She then raced in the Giro Donne, where for the second year running she won five stages and the general classification. On 29 July she won gold in the London Olympic Games road race winning the sprint from a 3-woman breakaway which formed following the final lap of the Box Hill, Surrey circuit on the return to London. She finished 16th in the time trial. In September, Vos won her second road race world title in Valkenburg, Netherlands after five second places in a row (2007–2011).

2013
In 2013, Vos started off her year with yet another dominant performance at the 2013 cyclo-cross world championships, winning her fifth world championship in a row, and her sixth overall. Vos took little time off after her unprecedented fifth consecutive title, winning mountain bike races and then taking her first win at the Tour of Flanders by outsprinting Ellen van Dijk. On 28 September Vos won another world road race championship after riding away from her challengers on a steep climb in the final lap of the Florence, Italy, course. She finished 15 seconds ahead of the second and third placed riders.

2014

Vos started the year with a record seventh world championship in cyclo-cross. Six of those titles were consecutive. Later in the year, she won the Giro d'Italia Femminile and the first edition of La Course. La Course took place on the last day of the Tour de France for men. The women's race was launched after a successful petition by Marianne Vos, Emma Pooley, Kathryn Bertine and Chrissie Wellington. She also won the first edition of The Women's Tour.

2015

Vos started the year with a 3rd place in the cyclo-cross world championships. She then switched to mountain biking, with an eye on participating in that discipline in the Rio Olympics. She won her first race, but broke a rib preparing for a race in Austria. The rest of her 2015 season was plagued by a persisting hamstring injury. She later announced she was overtrained and would not participate in the 2015–2016 cyclo-cross season.

2016
Vos recovered in 2016 and won her first World Tour race in stage 3 of the Tour of California. She was one of four women selected for the Dutch national team for the 2016 Summer Olympics that same month. She finished in 9th place in the Olympic road race, which was won by her teammate Anna van der Breggen.

2017
In 2017, Vos won a silver medal at the cyclo-cross world championships. She also won the road race at the European championships in Herning, Denmark and the general classification in the Ladies Tour of Norway stage race.

2018
Vos won a silver medal at the 2018 European championships in Glasgow. She also won two Women's World Tour events: the Open de Suède Vårgårda and the Ladies Tour of Norway for the second year running. Vos won all three stages, the general and the points classification of that race.

2019
Vos started the year with a bronze medal at the cyclo-cross world championships in Bogense. In March, she won the Trofeo Alfredo Binda for the fourth time. She was now tied with Maria Canins for most wins in this race. In May she won the Tour de Yorkshire and in July she won La Course for the second time.

2022

Vos started the year with an eighth Cyclocross World Championship title in Fayetteville, Arkansas, at the end of a fierce head-to-head battle with defending champ Lucinda Brand (Netherlands).

Marianne participated in first edition of Tour de France Femmes. She won stage 2 to Provins, defeating Katarzyna Niewiadoma, Elisa Longo Borghini and Silvia Persico in the sprint. This gave her the overall lead and made her holder of the yellow jersey. She also took the early lead in the points classification. She then won Stage 6 from Saint-Dié-des-Vosges to Rosheim, gaining a comfortable lead in the points classification and making Tour de France history by being the first woman to win a stage while wearing the yellow jersey. As a result, she extended her lead to +0:30 over both Niewiadoma and Persico. She fell out of contention for the yellow jersey after stage 7, but still maintained the lead in the points classification. Even though she had led this classification for several stages, she would wear the green jersey for the first time on the final day of the race. Ultimately, Vos finished 26th in the general classification, 36 mins and 56 secs behind winner Annemiek van Vleuten.

Outside sports
Vos is an ambassador for the Dutch charity Jeugdsportfonds which financially supports children of poor families who want to join a sports club. She is also an ambassador for Youth United for Sri Lanka (YU4SL), set up by young people to help underprivileged people in Sri Lanka. Speed skater Ireen Wüst and other Dutch celebrities joined Vos as ambassadors.

Career achievements

Awards
Cyclingnews.com – Best female rider: 2011, 2012, 2013, 2014
VeloNews.com – Women's Stage racer of the year: 2014
VeloNews.com – International Woman of the year: 2013
Dutch Sportswoman of the year: 2008, 2009, 2013
Dutch Female cyclist of the year: 2006, 2007, 2008, 2009, 2010, 2011, 2012, 2013
Cycle Sport Magazine – "Best Cyclist in the World": 2013

See also

 List of Dutch Olympic cyclists
 UCI Women's Road World Cup
 UCI Cyclo-cross World Cup

References

Further reading
Jeanine Laudy, Jan Willem Verkiel,: Strijd in het vrouwenpeloton: de Giro door de ogen van Marianne Vos en Ellen van Dijk , Tirion Sport . The story of Ellen van Dijk and Marianne Vos of the 2011 Giro d'Italia Femminile.

External links

 
 
 
 
 
 
 
 
 

1987 births
Cyclists at the 2008 Summer Olympics
Cyclists at the 2012 Summer Olympics
Cyclists at the 2016 Summer Olympics
Cyclists at the 2019 European Games
Cyclists at the 2020 Summer Olympics
Cyclists from North Brabant
Cyclo-cross cyclists
Dutch Tour de France Femme stage winners
Dutch cycling time trial champions
Dutch cyclists at the UCI Track Cycling World Championships
Dutch female cyclists
European Games medalists in cycling
European Games silver medalists for the Netherlands
Knights of the Order of Orange-Nassau
Living people
Medalists at the 2008 Summer Olympics
Medalists at the 2012 Summer Olympics
Olympic cyclists of the Netherlands
Olympic gold medalists for the Netherlands
Olympic medalists in cycling
Sportspeople from 's-Hertogenbosch
UCI Cyclo-cross World Champions (women)
UCI Road World Champions (women)
UCI Road World Championships cyclists for the Netherlands
UCI Track Cycling World Champions (women)